Thorner v Major [2009] UKHL 18 is an English land law case, concerning proprietary estoppel.

Facts
On Peter Thorner's Steart Farm, Cheddar, Somerset, David Thorner, second cousin, worked for Peter for 30 years unpaid, as well as on his parents’ farm, where he got housing and money. He worked long hours and believed he would inherit the farm, encouraged by Peter's conduct over 15 years, such as in 1990 giving a bonus relating to two assurance policies, saying ‘That’s for my death duties.’ But there was no explicit promise or assurance. Peter left the farm to David, and also money to others. But Peter destroyed the will when he fell out with the others and did not make a new will. So, Peter died intestate the property, by statute, would have passed to others. David claimed proprietary estoppel.

The Court of Appeal (Lloyd LJ, Ward LJ and Rimer LJ) held David had no proprietary estoppel claim because there was never a clear and unequivocal assurance.

John Randall QC held David had a right to Steart Farm.

Judgment
The House of Lords held that the only thing that mattered was whether a reasonable person could have relied on the conduct that looked like an assurance.

Lord Hoffmann said that speaking in oblique and allusive terms does not matter if one could reasonably believe one was being given an assurance. What mattered was whether Peter's conduct ‘would reasonably have been understood as intended to be taken seriously as an assurance which could be relied upon’. There was no requirement that Peter intended David to rely on him.

Lord Scott held to the view that proprietary estoppel can only be used where the assurer believes they have or will have very soon acquired a right in someone's land. He said though he would not disagree about proprietary estoppel, he would ‘find it easier and more comfortable to regard David’s equity as established via a remedial constructive trust.’ The elements of a claim are clear assurance, reasonable reliance, substantial detriment. Proprietary estoppel brings uncertain results, e.g. if Peter intended to give up the farm, but before then had wanted to use the farm as a home given his old age. Cases like Ramsden and Crabb can easily be understood as proprietary estoppel, but he finds inheritance cases easier to understand as being remedied through a remedial constructive trust, created by the parties’ common intention, since Gissing. Like Gillett.

Lord Walker held the elements for a proprietary estoppel are (1) a promise or representation by the defendant that the claimant has or will acquire some right in relation to the defendant's land (2) the claimant's reasonable reliance on this promise/representation (3) detriment suffered by the claimant by reason of his reliance on that promise/representation.

Lord Neuberger, agreed with Lord Walker, but wished to state the result in his own words.

See also

English land law
English trusts law
English property law

Notes

External links
Bailii

English land case law
House of Lords cases
2009 in case law
2009 in British law